The word Issawi or Issaoui can refer to:

Politics
Arab tribes in Iraq

People
Abu Yasser al-Issawi
Charles Issawi
Eifan Saadoun Al Issawi, Iraqi politician
Omar Al Issawi
Rafi al-Issawi
Safa Issaoui, Tunisian track runner
Salim Issawi, one of the hijackers of TWA Flight 840 (1969)

Arabic-language surnames